Julia Spiridonova (Yulka) (born October 30, 1972) is a Bulgarian novelist and a screenwriter. She was born in Sofia into a family of artists. She is the first Bulgarian nominated for Astrid Lindgren Memorial Award.

She was acknowledged as a writer in 1995 when her first short story "The Pacifier" won the annual UNESCO award. Her story was then included in English and French short story anthologies.

In 1996 Spiridonova was invited to take part in the screenplay jury of the Student Film Festival in Munich.

In 2006, her first novel My Sweet Pathwalker won a children's book manuscript competition run by the Bulgarian Writers' Association.

In 2008 her children's tale The Scabby Frog, illustrated by Ivan Gantschev, was presented at the International Bookfair in Hague.

In 2010 the Ministry of Education and Science awarded Spiridonova the Special Merit Award in recognition for her support in the development of the spiritual culture of the young generations.

In 2011, research carried out by the "I Read" website in 27 public libraries in Bulgaria showed that Spiridonova's books are the most often asked for and borrowed books.

Spiridonova also works as a screenwriter, having written more than 400 scripts for the Bulgarian National Television. She is the creator and author of several TV shows and series for children and teenagers.

Books
The Scissors (Ciela Books, 2022) with Damyan Damyanov
Sois Mon Ami (Elitchka, 2022)
The Cricket's Shadow (Kragozor, 2022)
Jigo's Adventures (Fut, 2022)
Voyage dans la Terre d'en Bas. Les Aventures de Baptiste, détective privé (Elitchka, 2022)
GooGoo Birdies's Fairtails (Softpres, 2001)
Kronos, toj nesrectnik! (Blesok, 2020)
Kronos, acest nefericit! (Editura Aramis, 2019)
Santa's secret agents (Kragozor, 2018)
Milyen varazslatot rejt a ho? (Terézvárosi Bolgár Önkormányzat, 2017)
Sun, Where Are You (Kragozor, 2017)
Kronos, that looser (Kragozor, 2016)
What Sorcery Had Snow (Kragozor, 2015)
Be My Friend (Kragozor, 2015)
A Tale of the Magic Flute (Enthusiast, 2013)
The Labakan's needle (Kragozor, 2013)
Max (Kragozor, 2012)
Blood of Kings (Kragozor, 2011)
The Countess Bathory (Kragozor, 2010) 
My Sweet Pathwalker (Kragozor, 2009) 
Krustyo - the Private Eye's Adventures in the Downworld (Fut, 2009)
Big Deal Tina (Fut, 2008) 
Adventures with Djigo (Fut, 2003) 
GooGoo Birdie's Stories (Damyan Yakov, 2000) 
The GooGoo Birdies (Interpress, 1999)

Awards
2023 - Astrid Lindgren Memorial Award (ALMA) Nominee
2022 - Astrid Lindgren Memorial Award (ALMA) Nominee
2021 - Astrid Lindgren Memorial Award (ALMA) Nominee
2020 - Astrid Lindgren Memorial Award (ALMA) Nominee
2019 - Astrid Lindgren Memorial Award (ALMA) Nominee
2018 - Astrid Lindgren Memorial Award (ALMA) Nominee
2017 - Astrid Lindgren Memorial Award (ALMA) Nominee
2016 - The Magic Pearl National Children's Choice Awards
2015 - The Quill Award winner, Children's Book of the Year category
2015 – The annual Hristo G. Danov award nominee, Book of the Year category
2012 – The Child Honorary Diploma for lifetime contribution to the happy childhood of Bulgarian children
2012 - The annual The Golden Apple Award nominee
2011 – The annual Hristo G. Danov award nominee, Book of the Year category
2010 – The annual P.R. Slaveykov - Contribution to the Bulgarian Literature award winner
2010 – The annual Konstantin Konstantinov award winner, Author of the Year category
2010 – The annual Hristo G. Danov award nominee, Book of the Year category
2006 - Children's book manuscript competition, held by the Bulgarian Writers Association for the My Sweet Pathwalker novel
2005 - Europe in Fairytale competition third prize winner
1995 – The annual UNESCO award for The Pacifier short story

Charity
From 2009 to the present Spiridonova has been the founder and organizer of the weekly "Who Loves Fairytales" initiative at the Children and Youth Department of the Sofia Capital Library.

From 2010 to the present she has been the founder and organizer of the "Where Children Live, There Should Be Children's Books" campaign. The campaign aims to set up libraries of newly published books for orphanages.

From 2015 to the present she has been the founder and organizer of the "Flying Pig" literary teen club initiative at the Children and Youth Department of the Sofia Capital Library.

See also

Petko Slaveykov
Hristo G. Danov

References

Further reading
reglibsliven.iradeum.com
radiosofia.bnr.bg
filmschoolfest-munich.de
unesco.org
biserche.com

External links
barnesandnoble.com
helikon.bg
kragozor.com
fiut.bg

Bulgarian novelists
Living people
1972 births
Bulgarian women novelists
21st-century Bulgarian novelists
21st-century Bulgarian women writers